The 1979 Women's World Team Squash Championships were held in England and took place from March 15 until March 20, 1979.

Results

Round Robin

Final

See also 
World Team Squash Championships
World Squash Federation
World Open (squash)

References 

World Squash Championships
World Championships
Squash tournaments in the United Kingdom
International sports competitions hosted by England
Squash
Women's World Team
Women's World Team Squash Championships